The Fiat Pulse is a subcompact crossover SUV produced by Fiat mainly for the South American market since 2021. It is also available as a performance model known as the Abarth Pulse and a coupe SUV derivative marketed as the Fiat Fastback since 2022.

Overview 
Revealed as an unnamed model in May 2021 in Brazil, its name was subsequently announced in June 2021 after three options were offered to the public, which are Pulse, Tuo, and Domo. Developed under the codename Project 363, the vehicle is built on the MLA platform which in turn is based on an improved platform used by the Argo hatchback. Both cars share some bodywork parts such as the windshield and doors. The Pulse went on sale in Brazil in October 2021 along with other South American countries.

Safety
The Pulse comes with 4 airbags, LED lighting, hill holder, traction control system, ESC, front ventilated disc brakes, and tire pressure monitoring system. Automatic high beam, lane departure warning system, and collision avoidance system are optional.

Abarth Pulse 

Fiat Fastback

The Fiat Fastback is a coupe SUV variant of the Pulse, which was released in August 2022. In Brazil, it is positioned as a flagship Fiat model only below the imported Fiat 500e. It is available with the 1.0-litre turbocharged and 1.3-litre turbocharged petrol engines. The Fastback nameplate was previously used for a concept coupe SUV based on the Fiat Toro in 2018.

Sales

References

External links 

 Official website (Brazil)
 Fiat Pulse (Argentina)

Pulse
Cars introduced in 2021
Mini sport utility vehicles
Crossover sport utility vehicles
Front-wheel-drive vehicles
Cars of Brazil